Biotinidase (amidohydrolase biotinidase, BTD), also known as biotinase, is an enzyme that in humans is encoded by the BTD gene.

The enzyme breaks down biotin amides, releasing free biotin and the amine. The main substrate is biocytin, or biotin linked to lysine. It is also capable of breaking apart biotin esters.

Function 
This enzyme allows the body to use and to recycle the B vitamin biotin, sometimes called vitamin H. Biotinidase extracts biotin from food because the body needs biotin in its free, unattached form. This enzyme also recycles biotin from enzymes in the body that use it as a helper component in order to function. These enzymes, known as carboxylases, are important in the processing of fats, carbohydrates, and proteins. Biotin is attached to these carboxylase enzymes through an amino acid (the building material of proteins) called lysine, forming a complex called biocytin. Biotinidase removes biotin from biocytin and makes it available to be reused by other enzymes.

Clinical significance 

Biotin, sometimes called vitamin H, is an important water-soluble vitamin that aids in the metabolism of fats, carbohydrates and proteins.  The human body cannot produce biotin, but it can obtain it from the diet, internal recycling and at some extent from intestinal bacteria.  Biotin deficiency can result in behavioral disorders, lack of coordination, learning disabilities and seizure.

Unlike most vitamins, which are noncovalently bound to enzymes, biotin is chemically linked (covalently bound), and therefore cannot be easily removed from the enzyme denaturation.  Without biotinidase activity, the vitamin biotin cannot be separated from foods and therefore cannot be used by the body.  Biotinidase deficiency is an inherited disorder caused by mutations in the BTD gene.  When biotinidase activity is deficient, biotin can be neither recycled within the body nor removed from ingested food.  Nor can biotin be recycled from enzymes to which it is bound.  Deficient biotinidase activity causes specific  metabolic enzymes, called carboxylases, to be nonfunctional, inhibiting the proper processing of proteins, fats, and carbohydrates.  Individuals lacking biotinidase activity can still have normal carboxylases if they ingest small amounts of biotin.
Approximately 1 in 60,000 newborns are affected by profound (less than 10 percent of normal enzyme activity) or partial (10-30 percent of normal enzyme activity) biotinidase deficiency.

Genetics 
The BTD gene is located on the short (p) arm of chromosome 3 at position 25, from base pair 15,618,326 to base pair 15,662,328.  Mutations in the BTD gene cause biotinidase deficiency.

Approximately 100 mutations in the BTD gene that lead to biotinidase deficiency have been discovered.  These mutations either prevent the enzyme from being made or cause the enzyme that is produced to be nonfunctional.

This condition is inherited in an autosomal recessive pattern, which means two copies of the gene in each cell must be altered for a person to be affected by the disorder. Most often, the parents of a child with an autosomal recessive disorder are not affected but are carriers of one copy of the altered gene.

Disease Database
BTD gene variant database

References

External links 
 

EC 3.5.1